The Girl in the Taxi is a three-act musical comedy written by Stanislaus Stange, with music by Benjamin Hapgood Burt. It is one of several adaptations of Le Fils à papa, a French comedy by Antony Mars and Maurice Desvallières. Producer Albert H. Woods staged it on Broadway in 1910.

Cast and characters
The characters and cast from the Broadway production are given below:

History
Antony Mars and Maurice Desvallières wrote Le Fils à papa, a three-act French comedy, in 1906. In early 1910, English-American author Stanislaus Stange adapted the play into an English-language musical comedy with songs by composer Benjamin Hapgood Burt. Stange's adaptation premiered at the Cort Theatre in Chicago on January 16, 1910. After running in Chicago and Boston, The Girl in the Taxi appeared on Broadway at the Astor Theatre on October 24, 1910. It played there for six weeks with 48 performances.

Notes

References

External links
 

1910 musicals
Broadway musicals
Musical comedy plays
Plays by Stanislaus Stange
Plays based on other plays